Manuel dos Reis Machado, commonly called Mestre Bimba (November 23, 1899  – February 5, 1974), was a Brazilian capoeira mestre (a master practitioner). He founded the capoeira regional school, one of the art's two main branches.

Early life
Machado was born in Salvador in the year 1899 but was not officially registered until 1900, resulting in some confusion surrounding his date of birth. Despite him being born in 1899, 1900 is the date most commonly known and published.

The son of Luiz Cândido Machado and Maria Martinha do Bonfim, Machado was born at the Bairro do Engenho Velho, Salvador. The nickname "Bimba", whose literal meaning was "phallus", came up as a result of a bet between his mother and the midwife during his birth. His mother bet that he was going to be a girl and the midwife bet he would be a boy; after he was delivered, the midwife revealed that he was a boy by pointing between his legs at his bimba. In the context of Brazil, "Bimba" also meant "beating".

He started learning capoeira when he was 12 years old, with a Capitão da Companhia Baiana de Navegação (Navigation Captain) from Estrada das Boiadas (present day Bairro da Liberdade) in Salvador, called Bentinho, even though in those days capoeira was still being persecuted by the authorities. He would later be known as one of the legendary founding fathers of contemporary capoeira, (the other being Vicente Ferreira Pastinha, also known as Mestre Pastinha), the father of modern capoeira angola.

Machado was a coal miner, carpenter, warehouse man, longshoreman, and horse coach conductor, but mainly a capoeirista.

Birth of the regional style 
At 18, Bimba felt that capoeira had lost all its efficacy as a martial art and an instrument of resistance, becoming a folkloric activity reduced to nine movements. It was then that Bimba started to restore movements from the old capoeira (later known as Angola), added movements from an extinct African fighting style called batuque – a type of martial art that he learned from his father (of which his father was a champion), as well as introducing movements created by himself. Bimba was the first to create a method of teaching to help facilitate learning because, until then, capoeira was only learned by watching and participating in the roda. This was the beginning of the development of capoeira regional.

It also has been theorized that Bimba received influence by other martial arts when adding and perfecting movements to the capoeira repertoire. He is known to have studied the method of capoeira teachers like Mestre Sinhozinho, Mario Aleixo and Anibal "Zuma" Burlamaqui, who mixed capoeira with martial arts like judo, boxing, Greco-Roman wrestling and Portuguese stick-fighting. Other sources, among them Mestre Itapoan, believe that Bimba made virtually no additions from other martial arts to capoeira, and that all its movements came from batuque or itself; moreover, there are reports of capoeira techniques similar to those from judo as far back as 1888, before Eastern martial arts came to Brazil. On the other hand, it is known that Bimba's student Cisnando Lima was trained in judo under Mitsuyo Maeda and Takeo Yano, and that other students sometimes faced Japanese martial artists in fights.

In 1928, a new chapter in the history of capoeira began, as well as a change in the way black people were looked upon by the Brazilian society. After a performance at the palace of Bahia's Governor, Juracy Magalhães, Bimba was finally successful in convincing the authorities of the cultural value of capoeira, thus in the 1930s ending its official ban, which had been in effect since 1890.Machado founded the first capoeira school in 1932, the Academia-escola de Cultura Regional, at the Engenho de Brotas in Salvador, Bahia. Previously, capoeira was only practiced and played on the streets. However, capoeira was still heavily discriminated against by upper-class Brazilian society. In order to change the pejorative reputation of capoeira and its practitioners as devious, stealthy and malicious, Bimba set new standards to the art.

His students had to wear a clean, white uniform, show proof of grade proficiency from school, exercise discipline, show good posture and many other standards. As a result, doctors, lawyers, politicians, upper-middle-class people, and women (until then excluded)  started to join his school, providing Bimba with legitimacy and support. Bimba was not completely against accepting exceptionally poor students, but only when they showed talent or attitude.

It's also known that Bimba tested his new students putting them in a strong gravata or neck lock for three minutes, only accepting them in his school if they endured said time without tapping out. However, after the entrance of his apprentice Cisnando Lima, he changed the initiation test to a demonstration of flexibility and a written examination.

 Capoeira regional is established 
In 1936, Bimba challenged fighters of any martial art style to test his regional style in a fight, which would be hosted under the boxing-like ruleset innovated by fellow capoeirista Anibal Burlamaqui. He had four matches, fighting against Henrique Bahia, Vítor Benedito Lopes, Américo Ciência and fellow capoeira master José Custódio "Zé I" dos Santos. Bimba won all matches, and received the nickname of "Três Pancadas" ("Three Hits"), meaning he only need three strikes at most to finish an opponent.

Related to his challenges, Bimba had a famous rivalry with other mestres about whether it was valid or not to use hand strikes in the roda, especially after he finished an opponent named Vitor with a telefone or galopante. Machado's main detractor, Lúcio "Barra Preta" de Tal, a police chief who had lost money with the result of the match, supposedly ambushed him on the Engenho Velho street in August 1936, carrying a gun and accompanied by six policemen armed with sabers. A scuffle broke out, only for Bimba to disarm and knock all the seven men senseless. According to Bimba, however, it wasn't properly an ambush: the policemen would be drunk and causing turmoil, and Bimba interfered in order to help a young boy they were attacking, starting the brawl only after receiving himself a saber attack that he had to employ his skill to dodge. The newspaper A Tarde covered the incident under the title of "It's not easy to catch a capoeirista! He defended himself using cabeçadas and rabos de arraia" ("Não é fácil pegar um capoeirista... Livrou-se da agressão com cabeçadas e rabos de arraia").

On June 9, 1937, he earned the state board of education certificate and officially registered the 1st Capoeira center.

Bimba's Capoeira Regional academy was geographically near Mestre Pastinha's Capoeira Angola school. While it is known that the two mestres respected each other and never talked bad about the other's school, according to mestres Atenilo and Itapoan, Bimba sometimes instructed his students to hit and injure Pastinha's in shared rodas.Nestor Capoeira, Capoeira: Roots of the Dance Fight Game

In 1942, Machado opened his second school at the Terreiro de Jesus on Rua das Laranjeiras. The school is still open today and was supervised by his former student, "Vermelho" until the early 1980s. The school then came under the brief supervision of Mestre Almiro, before being transferred to Mestre Bamba; the man who leads the school today. He also taught capoeira to the army and at the police academy. He was then considered "the father of modern capoeira".

In 1945, Bimba and his students were challenged by Jayme Ferreira, a Brazilian jiu-jitsu competitor trained by the Gracie family, who accused regional capoeiristas of avoiding fights. Bimba answered by saying capoeira regional was for self-defense, not for fighting under sport rules.

In 1949, the regional school toured Sao Paulo in order to show their art. However, their promoter would force them to work full exhibition matches (marmeladas, a word also used for professional wrestling), which Mestre Bimba didn't approve of. During this tour, they received two challenges to fight for real (pra valer), one by Brazilian catch wrestlers led by Piragibe and another one by capoeira carioca leader Mestre Sinhozinho. A two day event was held in Rio de Janeiro starting from April 2, pitting a team of capoeiristas regionales against cariocas and catch wrestlers. Bimba's school lost all the matches by either submission or knockout, with the main event being with his student Jurandir being defeated by carioca Luiz "Cirandinha" Aguiar. The final part was held on April 7, getting a similar result with carioca Rudolf Hermanny winning over regionalista Fernando Perez. It's said Bimba was so impressed that he learned some movements he saw in the fight to absorb them into his own style.

July 23, 1953, he was invited to demonstrate capoeira to the then president of Brazil, Getúlio Dorneles Vargas. Vargas says, "Capoeira is the only sport which was truly Brazilian."

Important names to Brazilian society at that time such as Dr. Joaquim de Araújo Lima (former governor of Guaporé), Jaime Tavares, Rui Gouveia, Alberto Barreto, Jaime Machado, Delsimar Cavalvanti, César Sá, Decio Seabra, José Sisnando and many others were Bimba's students.

 Legacy 
Unhappy with false promises and lack of support from local authorities in Bahia, he moved to Goiânia in 1973 at the invitation of a former student. He died a year later, on February 5, 1974, at the Hospital das Clínicas de Goiânia because of a stroke.

Bimba managed to recover the original values within capoeira, which were used amongst the black slaves centuries before him. For Bimba, capoeira was a fight but "competition" should be permanently avoided since he believed it was a "cooperation" fight, where the stronger player was always responsible for the weaker player and helped him to excel in his own fighting techniques.

Machado fought all his life for what he strongly believed was best for capoeira and succeeded. Machado was posthumously awarded the title Honoris Causa by the Federal University of Bahia.

 Bimba's academy rules 
Bimba strongly believed capoeira had an extraordinary value as a self-defense martial art, hence his efforts to develop its learning in a structured and methodical way.

Bimba developed a capoeira teaching method with commandments, principles and traditions, which are still part of the capoeira regional up to this day. Some of his commandments are:

 To stop smoking and drinking since it interferes with the players' performance
 Avoid demonstrating your progress to your friends outside the capoeira roda. Remember that surprise is your best ally in a fight
 Avoid conversation during training, instead observe and learn from watching
 Always ginga
 Practice daily the basic fundamentals
 Keep your body relaxed
 It is better to get "caught" in the roda than on the streets
 Don't be afraid to get close to the opponent. The closer you stay, the better you will learn
 Students must maintain good grades in school or be employed

Bimba also established his own capoeira principles as the basis for his capoeira teaching method:

 Gingar sempre (to keep oneself in constant movement when fighting); ginga is the capoeira basic movement
 Esquivar sempre (to dodge away from the opponent's attacks)
 All movements must have a purpose (attack and corresponding defense movement)
 Preserve a constant fixed position on the ground (acrobatic jumps makes one vulnerable)
 Play according to the rhythm determined by the berimbau (capoeira musical instrument)
 Always play close to your partner
 Respect a player when he/she can no longer defend an attack movement
 Protect the opponent's physical and moral integrity (during the practice, the stronger will protect the weaker player)

Consequently, Bimba created several traditions and rituals to support his methodology:

 A chair was used in order to train beginner students/players
 The charanga is the capoeira orchestra, composed by a berimbau and two pandeiros The singing (quadras e corridos), songs composed by Bimba to accompany the game
 The batizado (baptism), the first time the student plays capoeira at the sound of berimbauThe aspects that still makes capoeira regional unique is its method:

 Admission exam (physical test made with capoeira movements to identify students' abilities)
 The sequência (sequence) of the basic 17 capoeira attack and defence movements
 Practice of the different rhythms of the game
 Specific movements: traumatizing, projection, connected and unbalancing
 Practice of cintura desprezada (second sequence practice by advanced students)
 Formatura (capoeira teacher graduation)
 Especialização and emboscada (specific advanced exams)

To celebrate his 119th birthday, Google released a Google Doodle commemorating him.

Movies/DocumentaryMestre Bimba: A Capoeira Illuminada (2006) is a documentary about Mestre Bimba and Capoeira.

See also
 Mestre Pastinha
 Mestre Sinhozinho
 Norival Moreira de Oliveira
 João Grande
 João Pequeno
 Bira Almeida (Mestre Acordeon)

References

http://www.mestrebimbafundacao.blogspot.com/ Official Blog of the Fundação Mestre Bimba
http://www.capoeirabayarea.com/ Website of the Entity of Filhos de Bimba Escola de Capoeira in California – Professor Malandro
https://web.archive.org/web/20120616095052/http://www.filhosdebimba.info/ Website of the Entity of Filhos de Bimba Escola de Capoeira in Naples, Italy – Mestre Saguim
https://web.archive.org/web/20120929070532/http://filhosdebimbana.jimdo.com/  Website of the Entity of Filhos de Bimba Escola de Capoeira in Naples, Italy – Professor Fininho
http://www.capoeiranewcastle.co.uk/wp/ Website of the Entity of Filhos de Bimba Escola de Capoeira in Newcastle, United Kingdom – Professor Calango & Mestre Pelicano
https://web.archive.org/web/20130623072928/http://www.capoeirabimba.com/en/ Website of the Entity of Filhos de Bimba Escola de Capoeira in London, United Kingdom – Professor Pequeno Mestre
http://www.filhosdebimba.de/ Website of the Entity of Filhos de Bimba Escola de Capoeira in Stuttgart, Germany – Professor Comprido
https://web.archive.org/web/20130415054205/http://filhosdebimba-zagreb.hr/ Website of the Entity of Filhos de Bimba Escola de Capoeira in Zagreb, Croatia – Professor Bacteria
http://capoeira-antwerpen.weebly.com/ Website of the Entity of Filhos de Bimba Escola de Capoeira in Antwerp, Belgium – Professor Mandinga
http://www.fbeclebanon.com/ Website of the Entity of Filhos de Bimba Escola de Capoeira in Beirut, Lebanon – Professor Chapinha
http://filhosdebimbatoronto.blogspot.com/ Official Blog of Filhos de Bimba Escola de Capoeira in Toronto, Canada – Professora Lang
https://web.archive.org/web/20070929040442/http://www.mestrebimbaofilme.com.br/ Documentary, Mestre Bimba: A Capoeira Illuminada'' (2006).

External links

Capoeira mestres
Afro-Brazilian people
Brazilian capoeira practitioners
1899 births
1974 deaths
People from Salvador, Bahia